The 64th edition of the KNVB Cup started on September 5, 1981. The two legs of the final were played on May 12 and 18, 1982: AZ from Alkmaar (at the time called AZ'67) beat FC Utrecht 5–2 on aggregate and won the cup for the third time. From the quarter finals onwards, two-legged matches were held.

Teams
 All 18 participants of the Eredivisie 1981-82, entering in the second round
 All 18 participants of the Eerste Divisie 1981-82
 10 teams from lower (amateur) leagues

First round
The matches of the first round were played on September 5 and 6, 1981.

1 Eerste Divisie; A Amateur teams

Second round
The matches of the second round were played on October 31 and November 1, 1981. The Eredivisie clubs entered the tournament this round.

E Eredivisie

Round of 16
The matches of the round of 16 were played on January 16 and 17, 1982.

Quarter finals
The quarter finals were played on February 17 and March 17, 1982.

Semi-finals
The semi-finals were played on March 31 and April 28, 1982.

Final
The finals were played on May 12 and 18, 1982.

AZ would participate in the Cup Winners' Cup.

See also
Eredivisie 1981-82
Eerste Divisie 1981-82

External links
 Netherlands Cup Full Results 1970–1994 by the RSSSF

1981-82
1981–82 domestic association football cups
KNVB Cup